Mona Ghosh Shetty is an Indian voice-dubbing actor and dubbing director. She has dubbed in Hindi, Bengali, English, Marathi, and Urdu languages.

Personal life
Mona Ghosh Shetty is the daughter of former voice-dubbing artist Leela Roy Ghosh. While she dubs her foreign roles in Hindi most of the time, she also performs her voice-dubbing roles in English and Bengali. She runs a dubbing studio known as Sound & Vision India located in Andheri, Mumbai. She used to work with her mother who was the founder and president of the company before her death and they had set up the businesses together in the early 1990s. Her mother died on 11 May 2012.

Dubbing career
Shetty started as a voice artist at the age of five. She dubs in English, Hindi, Bengali, and Oriya professionally, but if one advertisement becomes popular then she has to do it in all the 10 official regional languages: Tamil, Telugu, Kannada, Malayalam, Bengali, Gujarati, Punjabi, Marathi, Oriya and Assamese. She has stated that "I don't know all the languages. There is always a supervisor who tells you about the nuances of the language and how it should be spoken." She specialises in dubbing for teenage, young adult and middle-aged female characters. For more than 15 years, she has been dubbing in Hindi for many leading female roles such as Cameron Diaz, Angelina Jolie, Kate Beckinsale, Kirsten Dunst, Halle Berry, Zoe Saldana, Drew Barrymore, Catherine Zeta-Jones, Aruna Shields, Jacqueline Fernandez, Katrina Kaif, Deepika Padukone and other celebrities. She is still the approved Hindi dub-over voice artist for those actresses. Shetty also dubs for television commercials, like an advertisement for an Indian airline. She recently dubbed for Giselli Monteiro in the 2009 film "Love Aaj Kal", Aruna Shields in the 2010 film "Prince" and Nargis Fakhri in the 2011 film "Rockstar" at Yash Raj Studios.  She recently gave the voiceover for Galadriel for the American fantasy television show The Lord of the Rings: The Rings of Power.

In Nirnayak (1997) she dubbed for Indrani Banerjee. It was her first film dubbing for a Hindi film.

Filmography

Animated series

Animated films

Dubbing roles

Animated series

Live Action television series

Live action films

Bollywood movies

Due to the actresses' poor Hindi knowledge and voice issues, the directors for these films could not allow the actresses to use their real voices, so Mona has dubbed for them to disguise their voices, despite that the movies were already shot in Hindi.

Hollywood movies

South Indian movies

Animated films

Production staff

Live action films

See also
List of Indian Dubbing Artists

References

External links
 
 
 

Indian child actresses
Indian voice actresses
Indian women film directors
21st-century Indian women singers
Indian voice directors
Living people
Actresses from Mumbai
Film directors from Mumbai
Actresses in Hindi cinema
Actresses in Hindi television
21st-century Indian actresses
21st-century Indian singers
Singers from Mumbai
Women musicians from Maharashtra
Place of birth missing (living people)
Year of birth missing (living people)